The economy of Belarus is an upper-middle income mixed economy. As a post-Soviet transition economy, Belarus rejected most privatisation efforts in favour of retaining centralised political and economic controls by the state. The highly centralized Belarusian economy emphasizes full employment and a dominant public sector. It has been described as a welfare state or market socialist. 
Belarus is the world's 74th-largest economy by GDP.

, Belarus ranks 53rd from 189 countries on the United Nations Human Development Index, and appeared in the group of states with "very high development". With an efficient health system, it has a very low infant-mortality rate of 2.9 (compared to 6.6 in Russia or 3.7 in the United Kingdom). The rate of doctors per capita is 40.7 per 10,000 inhabitants (the figure is 26.7 in Romania, 32 in Finland, 41.9 in Sweden) and the literacy rate is estimated at 99%. According to the United Nations Development Program, the Gini coefficient (inequality indicator) is one of the lowest in Europe.

Economic background
Before the October Revolution, Belarus was a relatively backward and underdeveloped country, heavily reliant on agriculture and with rural overpopulation. The Second World War devastated Belarus, which lost about a quarter of its population and suffered immense destruction of infrastructure. In the post-war years, Belarus industrialised and became an important trade hub between the Soviet Union and Europe. Manufacturing became a pillar of its economy emphasising tractors, heavy trucks, oil processing, metal-cutting lathes, synthetic fibres, TV sets, semi-conductors and microchips. In the 1980s, more than half of the industrial personnel of Belarus worked for enterprises with over 500 employees. Among the Soviet republics, it had an unusually high export rate of its products, about 80%, and was the most technologically advanced. Because of its role as a producer of products made from raw materials imported from the Soviet Union, Belarus was called "the Soviet assembly shop."

Since the disintegration of the Soviet Union and under Lukashenko's leadership, Belarus has maintained government control over key industries and eschewed the large-scale privatizations seen in other former Soviet republics.

The period between 1996 and 2000 was also characterised by significant financial distress, in particular in 1998 and 1999 as a result of the financial and economic crisis in Russia. This resulted primarily in a sharp increase in prices and the devaluation of the national currency, a decline in trade with Russia and other CIS countries, growth in inter-enterprise arrears, and overall deterioration of the country's balance of payments. Extreme tension within the foreign exchange market was the key factor that destabilized the economy in 1998 and 1999. In 1999, consumer prices grew by 294%.

Between 2001 and 2005, the national economy demonstrated steady and dynamic growth. The GDP grew at an average rate of 7.4 percent, peaking in 2005 at 9.2 percent. This growth was mainly a result of the performance of the industrial sector, which grew on average more than 8.7 percent per year, with a high of 10.4 percent in 2005. Potatoes, flax, hemp, sugarbeets, rye, oats, and wheat are the chief agricultural products. Dairy and beef cattle, pigs, and chickens are raised. Belarus has only small reserves of petroleum and natural gas and imports most of its oil and gas from Russia. The main branches of industry produce tractors and trucks, earth movers for use in construction and mining, metal-cutting machine tools, agricultural equipment, motorcycles, chemicals, fertilizer, textiles, and consumer goods. The chief trading partners are Russia, Ukraine, Poland, and Germany.

The Belarus GDP grew 9.9% in 2006. In the first quarter of 2007, GDP grew 8.2%. GDP further grew in 2008 by 10%.

Analysis of foreign direct investment to Belarus between 2002 and 2007 shows that nearly 80% of FDI was geared into the service sector, while industrial concerns accounted for 20%. Agricultural FDI was off-the-charts paltry.

Crisis of 2011

Shortly before the 2010 presidential election, average salaries in Belarus were increased by the government to $500 per month. It is believed to be one of the main reasons for the crisis in 2011. Other reasons for the crisis were strong governmental control in the economy, a discount rate lower than inflation and the budget deficit.

In January 2011, Belarusians started to convert their savings from Belarusian rubles to dollars and euros. The situation was influenced by rumors of possible devaluation of the ruble. Exchange rates in Belarus are centralized by the government-controlled National Bank of Belarus. The National Bank was forced to spend $1 billion of the foreign reserves to balance the supply and demand of currency On March 22, it stopped the support to banks. The National Bank also didn't change the exchange rate significantly (3,000 BYR per dollar on January 1 and 3,045 BYR on April 1), so the increased demand of dollars and euro exhausted cash reserves of banks. In April and May 2011, many people had to wait for several days in queues to buy dollars in the exchange booths. In April, Belarusian banks were given informal permission of government to increase the exchange rate to 4,000 BYR for 1 dollar (later 4,500 BYR), but few people started to sell dollars and euro. On May 24, the ruble was officially devalued by 36% (from 3,155 to 4,931 BYR per 1 dollar). But the shortage of the currency retained. As a result of the shortage, a black market of currency was created. In July 2011, the black market exchange rate was nearly 6,350 BYR per 1 dollar, in August, it reached 9,000 BYR per 1 dollar.

In September 2011, National Bank of Belarus introduced a free exchange market session to determine a market value of the ruble.

Recovery from the crisis was difficult due to isolation of the Belarusian government from the EU and US.

The crisis strongly affected the economy. Inflation reached 108.7% in 2011. Average salary (counted in dollars) decreased from $530 in December 2010 to $330 in May 2011. In May 2012, the average salary reached $436 (3,559,600 with 8,165 per dollar). Refinancing rate (analogue of discount rate) rose from 10.5% in December 2010 to 45% in December 2011 and fell to 32% in June 2012. In November 2011, interest rates of several banks reached 120% in rubles.

2015 unemployment regulation
In April 2015, Alexander Lukashenko signed a bill "On preventing freeloading practices" which introduced a fine on unemployed population. This law obliges all citizens who are paying direct taxes less than 183 days every year to pay a fee in the size of 20 basic amounts (BYN 360 ≈ $250). Mass media compared the bill with a struggle with "тунеядцы", or social parasites, in Soviet Union. Several groups of people are exempt from paying the fee: parents with a child under 7 years old, disabled persons, students, etc. Avoiding of payment is going to be punished by fines, administrative arrests and compulsory public works.

2020 COVID figures
The Belarusian economy was relatively less impacted by the COVID-19 pandemic due to relatively light and delayed Covid-19 lockdown and quarantine measures due to Lukashenko's trivialization of the pandemic. Professor Victor Sayevich said in September 2020 that Belarus suffered a decline in economic figures of between 1.5% and 2%, whereas European countries sustained drops around 12%. Contemporaneous political unrest and increased state repression also negatively impacted the economy.

Wages and labour market

The Belarusian labour market is highly regulated. Important elements of the central-planning system are still in place. In principle, the decision to determine wages is left to firms, but the Government can affect the structure of wages through the so-called tariff system, a type of centrally determined wage grid. The tariff system is binding in the budget sector, including enterprises and organisations mainly financed and subsidised within the state and/or the local budgets. The private (so-called self-financing sector) sector, representing, as already noted, only a small share of employment, has little autonomy.

Unemployment 
Official unemployment rate is lower than 1%. Methods of International Labour Organization (international standard) also include job-seekers who are not registered officially. Many unemployed people in Belarus are trying to avoid registration, because of obligatory public works.

There are no official statistics of unemployment using the ILO methods. 6.1% Belarusians of economically active population called themselves unemployed during the 2009 census. In July 2012, World Bank concluded that the real unemployment rate is seven times higher than the official rate. Former labour minister Alexander Sosnov estimates that the unemployment rate is 10% of the economically active population According to Charter 97 estimate, the real unemployment in Belarus may be 15% or even 24%.

Labour rights 
In 2021, International Trade Union Confederation listed Belarus among top 10 worst countries for working people in the world (Global Rights Index). Reasons for worsening of the situation included state repression of independent union activity, arbitrary arrests, and severe cases of limited or no access to justice.

During the 2020 Belarusian protests, several companies attempted to start a strike and were met with brutal repression. In 2021, three employees of Byelorussian Steel Works were imprisoned for attempting to organize a strike.

Economy sectors

In the Soviet period, Belarus specialized mainly in machine building and instrument building (especially tractors, large trucks, machine tools, and automation equipment), in computers and electronics industry and in agricultural production. In 1992, industry in Belarus accounted for approximately 38 percent of GDP, down from 51 percent in 1991. This figure reflects a decline in the availability of imported inputs (especially crude oil and deliveries from Russia), a drop in investments, and decreased demand from Belarus's traditional export markets among the former Soviet republics. Belarus's economy was also affected by decreased demand for military equipment, traditionally an important sector.

In 1994, gross industrial output declined by 19 percent. At the beginning of 1995, every industrial sector had decreased output, including fuel and energy extracting (down by 27 percent); chemical and oil refining (18 percent); ferrous metallurgy (13 percent); machine building and metal working (17 percent); truck production (31 percent); tractor production (48 percent); light industry (33 percent); wood, paper, and pulp production (14 percent); construction materials (32 percent); and consumer goods (16 percent).

In 1996, a Free Economic Zone (FEZ) area was set up in Brest. The programme has been expanded to Minsk, Gomel, Vitebsk, Grodno, and Mogilev. As of 2020, more than 270 foreign organizations have benefited from the opportunity. Membership in a FEZ confers substantial benefits:

As of 2013, some of Belarusian industry was inflicted with overproduction: its unsold goods stocks were estimated to be worth at least US$3.8 billion, including 20,000 unsold Belarus-brand tractors.

Land ownership is tightly regulated in Belarus. The Land Code and Presidential Decree 667 was issued in 2007, and follows strict guidelines according to its "targetted use". Approximately 90% of the land is dedicated by this means to agricultural or forestry use.

Agriculture

The cumulative decline of value-added reached 30 percent since 1991, and 15 percent since 1995. The share of agriculture in GDP declined by over 10-percentage point to 14 percent in 1997. This happened, irrespective to the president's economic strategy of self-sufficiency in food production in 2001. The decline in overall agriculture production partly could be attributed to unfavorable weather conditions (like floods), but declines in the harvests of potatoes, vegetables, and other crops that grow mostly in private plots were smaller than in produce grown by collective farms. Also, animal breeding has been in decline and it is concentrated in the state sector. Subsidization of agricultural sector in Belarus amounted to 1–2 percent of GDP in the form of direct government credits, advanced payments for the realization of state orders of major crops, at strongly negative interest rates. Additionally, a state budget fund, Agriculture Support Fund provides funds to compensate food producers for the costs of inputs (fertilizers and equipment) that amounted to another 1–2 percent of GDP in 1996–1997. Finally, the Central Bank of Belarus issued subsidized credits to the agriculture sector at an interest rate of half the refinance rate. However, in spite of the fact that state-owned and collective farms cultivate about 83 percent of agricultural land and benefited the most from the government subsidies, privately run farms and private plots produce more than 40 percent of gross output.

Belarus can be divided into three agricultural regions: north (flax, fodder, grasses, and cattle), central (potatoes and pigs), and south (pastureland, hemp, and cattle). Belarus' cool climate and dense soil are well suited to fodder crops, which support herds of cattle and pigs, and temperate-zone crops (wheat, barley, oats, buckwheat, potatoes, flax, and sugar beets). Belarus' soils are generally fertile, especially in the river valleys, except in the southern marshy regions.

The greatest changes in agriculture in the first half of the 1990s were a decline in the amount of land under cultivation and a significant shift from livestock to crop production because crops had become a great deal more profitable than before. The sales price for crops generally increased more than production costs, while inputs for livestock (such as imported fodder) have increased in price beyond livestock sales prices.

The food processing industry in the country is led primarily by state concern Belgospischeprom and local municipal or regional owned production facilities.

Textiles
The Orsha Linen Mill, which is a part of the Belarusian State Concern Bellegprom, processes from flax a number of linen fabrics, which necessitates "spinning, weaving, dyeing, mechanical, chemical softening, shrinkage and other textile processings." The linen mill was projected from 1928; the first factory was completed in 1930, the second in 1961 and the third in 1972. In 2008, the plant supplied 8% of the global market for linen fabrics, when 5,000 workers processed 25,000 tonnes of flax fiber.

The OJSC Slavianka plant in Babruisk houses modern textile equipment. The first trousers were commissioned in 1930, and today the firm produces of the most modern fabrics:
 Coats and costumes
 Dresses and blouses
 Clothes for sports
 Business-style clothing for students
 Special clothes

Energy

Belarus is a partner country of the EU INOGATE energy programme, which has four key topics: enhancing energy security, convergence of member state energy markets on the basis of EU internal energy market principles, supporting sustainable energy development, and attracting investment for energy projects of common and regional interest.

Beneficial terms of Russian oil and gas deliveries are behind a degree of economic dependence on Russia, Belarus' EAEU neighbour. According to some estimates, profits stemming from the low prices the country pays for Russian gas and oil -either consumed locally or processed and then re-exported- has occasionally accounted to up to 10% of national GDP. Besides, the main export market for the Belarusian agricultural and industrial produce lies in its Russian neighbour.

Nuclear energy 

In 2008, the Belarusian government decided to build a nuclear power plant. The help of Power Machines Company, Atomstroyexport, Rosatom and Atommash was enlisted to erect in Shulniki, Hrodna Voblast two pressurized water reactors of the AES-2006 type. The first unit was commissioned not long after December 2019.

Electricity
The electric power sector of the country is amalgamated into the state-owned production union of the power sector “Belenergo”, which consists, apart from the central dispatch unit ODU, of six republican unitary regional power system enterprises (RUP-Oblenergo) and of entities of all kinds of ownership that carry out repair, maintenance and rehabilitation of facilities, research and development, service activities, and construction of new power sector facilities. RUP-Oblenergo are set up on particular territory (the regional power systems cover the relevant geographic administrative units of Belarus). RUP-Oblenergo are vertically integrated companies that perform generation, transmission, distribution and supply of electricity.

Oil
All the activities related to prospecting, exploration and production of oil and associated gas in the country are carried out by the government-controlled concern Belneftekhim via its subsidiary, the unitary republic enterprise Belorusneft. Belorusneft exports about 50% of its oil output. About 50 out of total of 70 known fields are currently under production. Belarus' own production covers only about 30% of domestic oil consumption. For this reason, the Government is seeking ways to access oil and gas resources on the territory of the Russia and other countries, so that oil produced there could be delivered to refineries in Belarus and refined products would be sold domestically and on export markets.

Belarus has two state-owned oil pipeline operating companies, both inherited from Glavtransneft in 1991. Gomel Oil Transportation Enterprise (RUP Gomeltransneft Druzhba) operates pipelines to the west and southwest directions, and Novopolotsk Oil Transportation Enterprise (NRUPTN “Druzhba”) for the north (Belarus-Lithuania) direction. All decisions concerning plans to increase capacity or build new capacity are taken by these two state-owned companies.

The activities of oil pipeline operating companies are regulated in accordance with the Law on Natural Monopolies, which explicitly prescribes a mechanism for their regulation by a state regulator. The Law on Natural Monopolies considers oil pipeline transport operators to be natural monopolies (Article 3). The Law also has certain requirements for transparency of their activities. Domestic oil transportation via pipelines is primarily regulated by the Law on Trunk Pipelines (2002), n 87–3. Article 27 of the Law regulates pipeline transport service in accordance with the capacity of the pipelines and actual throughput, based on the principle of equal access and non-discrimination.

Natural gas
Almost all of the natural gas used in Belarus is imported from Russia (about 99% of consumption). Domestic gas prices continue to be regulated by the government and in many instances cover only a fraction of the actual cost. Belarus has a well-developed gas transportation and gas distribution networks that ensure reliable supplies of natural gas to the consumers in the country. Beltransgaz, 100% state-owned joint stock company, owns and operates the system of main natural gas pipelines. In November 2002, the Belarusian parliament passed a law allowing for the privatization of Beltransgaz. An agreement was reached in 2006 with Gazprom about the acquisition of a 50% plus a share stake in Beltransgaz at a price of $2.5 billion.

Oil shale

Belarus contains large, but undeveloped reserves of oil shale, estimated at 8.8 billion tonnes. As of 2010, Belarus seeks to start exploiting the reserves to reduce its dependence on the Russian hydrocarbons.

Renewable energy

Pulp and paper

Slonim in the Grodno oblast has been the site of a paper mill since 1806. In 1995, the plant was renamed 'Slonim Cardboard and Paper Plant "Albertin"' and now produces cardboard, paper and tissue paper. Interpaper LLC produces much of Belarus' toilet paper, paper napkins and paper towels. Svetlogorsk Pulp&Board Mill produces paper bags and paper boxes.

The OJSC Spartak (paper mill) is located in Škloŭ and produces 20 kinds of paper. In 2017, the state-owned timber and paper industries concern, Bellesbumprom, put up for sale an 85.14% stake in Spartak for $7.393m.

Mining
Although not rich in minerals, Belarus has been found to have small deposits of iron ore, nonferrous metal ores, dolomite, potash (for fertilizer production), rock salt, phosphorites, refractory clay, molding sand, sand for glass production, and various building materials.

Belarus also has deposits of industrial diamonds, titanium, copper ore, lead, mercury, bauxite, nickel, vanadium, and amber.

In 2019, the country was the 2nd largest world producer of potash, and the 20th largest world producer of salt.

Metal production

In 1982, the Soviet Union decreed a steel works should be erected and the Byelorussian Steel Works was born two years later in order primarily to process local scrap steel. The major items of production consist of rebar, billet, channel, wire rod and cold heading wire rod. More than 50 alloyed and low-alloyed structural and carbon steel grades are produced by the plant. Two BSW shops produce steel cord, brass bead wire and hose wire.

Aluminum and stainless steel are sourced for the domestic market in Russia and Serbia.

Tsvetmet casts as many as 5,000 tons per annum of non-ferrous metal like copper, bronze and brass; while cast iron and steel parts as large as 8,000 kg are produced by the Universal-Lit company. The latter company is a part of Sergey Romanovich's Niva-Holding empire of integrated engineering solutions for the mining industry, which employs 2,100 people in Soligorsk, Minsk, Mogilev and Urechye across several subsidiary organizations.

Manufacturing

Belarus is home to several domestic automotive manufacturers such as BelAZ, which makes haulage and earthmoving equipment, MZKT, which makes heavy off-road vehicles, especially military trucks, Neman, which makes public transport buses, and MoAZ, which makes anything else industrial with wheels. Most vehicles manufactured in Belarus are commercial vehicles. Belarus has been seeing foreign automotive companies setting up partnerships and automotive factories in the country. Belarusian company MAZ and German company MAN have been in partnership since 1997. Belkommunmash makes electric urban transit vehicles.

The most recent partnership has been between American company General Motors and Belarusian company Unison SP ZAO to produce the Cadillac Escalade for Russian and CIS markets.

The :be:Мотавела plant was located in the city of Minsk between 1945 and 2018, but beginning in 2013, the government started to question the will of ATEK Holdings, who had managed the company for a number of years. ATEK was not fulfilling its investment programme, and eventually declared bankruptcy in 2017. The premises have become a sort of multi-tenant light industrial facility.

This is intended to be a manufacturing centre for the Eurasian Economic Union, with good transport links to the European Union.

Chemical industry

The Belarusian chemical industry specializes in extracting value from the Russian oil products which transit through the country's pipelines to Germany and the west. Synthetic polymers like nylon, viscose, acrylic, polyester and polyethylene are produced from this stream as well as household chemical products. Oil refineries are located in Navapolacak (Naftan) and in Mazyr (Mozyr Oil Refinery).

More than 500 kinds of chemical and petrochemical products are produced in Belarus by one firm: the Belneftekhim Concern, which is "among the largest and most strategically important" businesses in the country, and was created in 1997, unites most important chemical industries under one umbrella. It provides about 30 percent of all industrial output in Belarus and half of exports, which go to over 120 countries worldwide. More than 70 percent of petrochemical products are sold abroad.

Mineral fertilizers in the nitrogen phosphorus and potassium complex are produced by Belaruskali at the Starobin plant. Belarusian Grodno Azot is one of major players in global UAN fertilizer market.

Defense
During Soviet times, Belarus’ radio-electronic industry was primarily oriented towards military applications. With the break-up of the Soviet military and the reduction in size of the new state's military establishments, the Belarus defense sector desperately needs to export to survive. Currently, under Belarusian law, its weapons exports are required to be carried out through one of four licensed weapons trade exporters: Belspetsvneshtekhnika, Beltekhexport, Belvneshpromservis and Belorusintorg. Certain other enterprises are permitted to sell products that they developed or control.

Banking

Six commercial banks, four formerly state-owned specialized banks Belagroprombank (agricultural sector), Promstroibank (industrial sector), Vneshekonombank (foreign trade), and Belarusbank (savings bank) and two universal banks (Priorbank and Belbusinessbank) dominated the banking system. These former state-owned specialized banks accounts for over 80 percent of the banking system outstanding loans, over 70 percent of domestic currency deposits, and all the NBB's refinancing credit. Many commercial banks are subject to direct and personal influence of the government since many officials at the ministerial level participate in chairing and managing banks. Commercial banks act as agents of the central bank distributing state financial resources. Therefore, also the Central Bank of Belarus fulfills mostly technical functions as the president and government are permanently interfering in the operation of the whole banking sector by decrees and resolutions.

Luxury goods
Spirits and liquors are produced at the eight distilleries of the Joint Stock Company «Minsk kristall», which in turn is managed by the state-run Belgospishcheprom concern.

Belyuvelirtorg, which was organized in 1948, is a chain of 64 jewelry stores present all over Belarus. The chain retails items made of gold, silver and natural stones as well as watches and the like. The chain produces precious metal decorative chain and its own line of rings, bracelets and earrings in its Gomel factory.

Information technology
Information technology was a growing sector of Belarus economy. In the early 2000s, a propitious climate was created in the country: IT companies received a 0% rate on taxes and state subsidies, income tax for tech workers was also reduced. Launched in 2006, the Hi-Tech Park on the northeastern outskirts of Minsk was meant to become Belarusian Silicon Valley. In 2019 Lukashenko visited the HTP and called it his favorite project. By 2020, it hosted more than 750 start-ups and outsourcing companies that employed 58,000 workers. Overall, more than 100,000 citizens worked in IT.

In the last two decades Belarusian IT turned into a major tech hub in Europe, it made up 5.5% of the country's GDP and exported up to $2 billion (€1.69bn) worth of software.

The nation-wide opposition crackdown led by the authorities after 2020 protests resulted in significant decline of the previously booming IT sector because most tech specialists fled the country. Most Minsk-born start-ups relocated to other European countries, only in 2021 more than 15,000 IT workers left the country. More than 3000 tech workers had gone to Ukraine, 1800 employees of 30 companies with total investments of $76.8 million moved to Poland, at least 41 companies went to Lithuania. Such giants as Viber and Wargaming joined the exodus.

2022 Russian Invasion of Ukraine provoked the second wave of IT brain drain in Belarus. According to Dev.by, it was even bigger than the first one. Almost 40% of companies faced refuses in new contracts due to sanctions, imposed on Belarus.

In August 2021 Lukashenko accused HTP companies of working 'for the USA for half prices'. On April 4, 2022, he commanded to 'deal with the tech workers' and return the IT sector into equal terms with other industries. In March 2022 taxes for IT companies were raised.

Tourism

Because of its position, Belarus is actively visited with transit purposes: about 1,500,000 arrivals per year.

Russian people are greater part of the inbound tourist flow, but there is no proper number of their arrivals as the border between Russia and Belarus is crossed without any border control as a part of the Union State policy.

Belarusian health resorts and sanatoriums are popular with Russian tourists because of relatively lower prices. In 2010, Belarus had 334 sanatoria, health resorts and health-improving organizations and other specialized accommodation facilities.

The number of arrivals of foreign visitors to Belarus in 2000 was 2,029,800. Since 2005, this number fluctuates between 4,737,800 and 5,673,800. Private arrivals are the most popular purpose of the travel. In all these indicators, crossings of Russian-Belarusian border are excluded, though they are likely to be significant.

As in 2010, the number of tourist departures abroad was 7,464,200. There were 783 travel agencies (in 2010) in the country and they serve small part of all arrivals of foreign citizens and departures of Belarusians. This also leads to the widespread opinion that tourism in Belarus is negligible. Most of the travel agencies are private, more than 50% of them are situated in Minsk.

The main partners in the field of international tourism are countries of the former Soviet Union, Germany, Poland, United Kingdom, Turkey, Czech Republic, Slovakia, Bulgaria, Sweden, and the Netherlands.

The profit from foreign tourism amounts to less than US$200 per each tourist. The volume of tourism in total export makes up 1%. The most popular among the visitors are: Minsk City (40% of visitors), Grodno Oblast (32%), Brest Oblast (22%), Vitebsk Oblast (5%).

The number of hotels has grown from 256 to 359 in 2010. The intensive construction of new hotels is organized in Minsk because of the planned Ice Hockey World Championships in 2014. But the average rate of use of the hotels does not exceed 40%.

The number of employees in tourism and recreation areas in 2010 were 9,900.

A World Heritage Committee session, held in Durban (South Africa) approved the addition of the Architectural, Residential and Cultural Complex of the Radziwill Family at Nesvizh into the World Heritage List. The castle in Mir was also included in this list.

International cooperation and treaties
Belarus became a member of ICSID in 1992 and UNCITRAL in 2004. As of 2009, there had been no cases involving Belarus in ICSID arbitration. As of June 2008, Belarus had concluded 54 Bilateral Investment Treaties (BITs); of these BITs more than 20 were with first-world countries. As of April 2009, Belarus had signed Double Taxation Treaties (DTTs) with 61 countries. As of 2009, the corporate tax rate was 24%. In 2009, a flat tax rate of 12% was imposed on personal incomes, and the standard rate of VAT was 18%. Import and export duties are mostly ad valorem. An environmental tax is imposed on the release of contaminants and the extraction of natural resources. Belarus is a member of the Eurasian Economic Union. Belarus accepted in 2001 the IMF Agreement that the foreign exchange rate be free of restrictions on payments and transfers. Residents of Belarus need a permit from the National Bank of Belarus to open bank accounts in foreign countries. As of 2009, the social insurance rate payable by the employer was 35%. In 2009, the average monthly wage was $500, and "a rigid wage determination process" was in place. The labour market, which is governed by the Republican Labour Arbitration body, is inflexible and strict limitations apply to severance and termination. The right to strike is allowed for all employees except those of the state, and succeeds on a two-thirds majority. Corporations which wish to hire a foreign labourer are subject to a permit process determined by the Ministry of Internal Affairs. Entrepreneurship "is subject to prolific legislative activity" and "very high number of administrative controls", and although the country signed on to the UN Convention against Corruption in 1995, the Corruption Perception Index had Belarus ranked high in the league tables.

Environmental issues

Belarus has established ministries of energy, forestry, land reclamation, and water resources and state committees to deal with ecology and safety procedures in the nuclear power industry.

The most serious environmental issue in Belarus results from the 1986 accident at the Chernobyl nuclear power plant across the border in the Ukrainian SSR, had a devastating effect on Belarus. As a result of the radioactivity release, many villages were abandoned. About 70% of the nuclear fallout from the plant landed on Belarusian territory, and about 25% of that land is considered uninhabitable. Resettlement and medical costs were substantial and long-term. Government restrictions on residence and use of contaminated land are not strictly enforced.

Gross Regional Product (GRP)

Other statistics

Investment (gross fixed)–
 24.2% of GDP (2005 est.)

Household income or consumption by percentage share–
 lowest 10%: 3.4%
 highest 10%: 23.5% (2002)

Distribution of family income – Gini index–
 27.9 (123)
 country comparison to the world: 123

Agriculture – products–
 grain, potatoes, vegetables, sugar beets, flax; beef, milk

Industrial production growth rate–
 11.5% (2008 est.)
 country comparison to the world: 8

Electricity–
 production: 29.91 TWh (2006)
 country comparison to the world: 63
 consumption: 30.43 TWh (2006)
 country comparison to the world: 58
 exports: 5.789 TWh (2006)
 imports: 10.15 TWh (2006), mainly from Russia, Ukraine, and Lithuania

Electricity – production by source–
 fossil fuel: 99.5%
 hydro: 0.1%
 other: 0.4% (2001)
 nuclear: 0%

Oil–
 production:  (2007 est.)
 country comparison to the world: 67
 consumption:  (2007 est.)
 country comparison to the world: 61
 exports:  (2005 est.)
 country comparison to the world: 45
 imports:  (2005 est.)
 country comparison to the world: 27

Natural gas–
 production: 164 million cu m (2007 est.)
 country comparison to the world: 75
 consumption: 21.76 billion cu m (2007 est.)
 country comparison to the world: 32
 exports: 0 cu m (2007 est.)
 country comparison to the world: 45
 imports: 21.6 billion cu m (2007 est.)
 country comparison to the world: 13

Current account balance–
 -$3.832 billion (2008 est.)
 country comparison to the world: 158

Exports – commodities–
 machinery and equipment, mineral products, chemicals, metals; textiles, foodstuffs

Imports – commodities–
 mineral products, machinery and equipment, chemicals, foodstuffs, metals

Reserves of foreign exchange & gold–
 $8.424 billion ( 2021 est.)
 country comparison to the world: 88th

Debt – external–
 $9.127 billion (December 31, 2008 est.)
 country comparison to the world: 86

Exchange rates–
 Belarusian rubels per US dollar – 17,500 (August 2015), 10,000 (April 2014), 8,650 (Jan 9, 2013), 8,180 (Mar 7, 2012), 8,900 (Nov 9, 2011),  4,977 (May 31, 2011, after the devaluation)   2,130 (2008 est.), 2,145 (2007), 2,144.6 (2006), 2,150 (2005), 2,170 (2004)

Sanctions

A number of state-owned Belarusian companies were sanctioned by the EU, USA, UK, Canada following 2006, 2010, 2012 and 2020 elections. In 2020 and 2021, the EU imposed sanctions on several companies, including MAZ, MZKT, BelAZ (automotive industry), Dana Holdings real estate company, trading companies Bremino Group, Sohra, Logex, Globalcastcom Management, NNK, and other companies. On 24 June 2021, the EU introduced the sectoral sanctions that affected petroleum and fertilizer production, tobacco industry, supply of dual-purpose equipment, and access to the EU financial markets by the Belarusian government. In 2007, the U.S. Treasury imposed sanctions on Belneftekhim concern and its subordinated companies. They were later suspended, but not cancelled. In 2021, USA renewed them and imposed new sanctions on several companies. In 2021, UK and Canada imposed similar sanctions on several companies.

In 2020–2021, Belarusian authorities made different efforts to circumvent the Western sanctions. They also hid the statistics to prevent revealing the ways used to circumvent them and track their effects. In particular, access to data regarding production and exports of the sanctioned goods became restricted to public. In October 2021, Belstat started to hide data regarding exports of tractors and trucks. Overall classified exports in January–August 2021 is estimated at US$8.2 billion. In September 2021, Alexander Lukashenko mentioned minister of industry  and vice prime minister  as the people who organized the circumvention of sanctions. He also accused several workers of state factories of gathering information about the ways used to circumvent the sanctions, and he threatened them with imprisonment. 13 workers from Grodno Azot fertilizer factory, Naftan oil refinery, BMZ steel mill and Belarusian Railway were arrested by the Belarusian KGB in a possible connection with this statement. It was reported that some of them were accused of state treason. At least two of them were later released. In June 2021, Belorusneft was removed from subordination of Belneftekhim. This move was believed to be connected with the sanctions.

See also
 Belarusian rubel
 Corporatism
 Dirigisme
 National Bank of the Republic of Belarus
 Russia-Belarus energy dispute
 State capitalism

References

External links
 
 Belarus Digest – Economy 
 The Minsk Herald – Economy 
 Tariffs applied by Belarus as provided by ITC's ITC Market Access Map, an online database of customs tariffs and market requirements.

 
Belarus